Benthofascis otwayensis is an extinct species of sea snail, a marine gastropod mollusk in the family Conorbidae.

Description
It was originally described as a subspecies of Benthofascis atractoides, but it is wider bodied and its geologic history extends to the Oligocene instead of the Miocene for B. atractoides.

Distribution
This extinct marine species is endemic to Oligocene of Victoria, Australia

References

 Long, D.C. (1981) Late Eocene and early Oligocene Turridae (Gastropoda: Prosobranchiata) of the Brown's Creek and Glen Aire Clays, Victoria, Australia. Memoirs of the National Museum of Victoria, 42, 15–55, pls. 4–7

otwayensis
Gastropods of Australia